Theodorus Jozef Dekker (Dirk Dekker, 1 March 1927 - 25 November 2021) was a Dutch mathematician.

Dekker completed his Ph.D. degree from the University of Amsterdam in 1958. His thesis was titled "Paradoxical Decompositions of Sets and Spaces".

Dekker invented an algorithm that allows two processes to share a single-use resource without conflict, using only shared memory for communication, named Dekker's algorithm.

References

Prof. dr. T.J. Dekker, 1927 - at the University of Amsterdam Album Academicum website

External links
The Mathematics Genealogy Project entry for T. J. Dekker

1927 births
2021 deaths
Dutch mathematicians
University of Amsterdam alumni
Academic staff of the University of Amsterdam
People from Heerhugowaard